Ballygowan may refer to:

Places in Northern Ireland
 Ballygowan, County Down, a village in County Down
 Ballygowan railway station, on the Belfast and County Down Railway
 Four other townlands in County Down; see List of townlands in County Down:
 Ballygowan, Aghaderg, County Down
 Ballygowan, Moira, County Down
 Ballygowan Halt railway station on the Banbridge, Lisburn and Belfast Railway
 Ballygowan, Drumbeg, County Down
 Ballygowan, Kilkeel, County Down
 Ballygowan, County Antrim
 Ballygowan, County Tyrone; see List of townlands of County Tyrone

Places in the Republic of Ireland
 Ballygowan, County Carlow; see List of townlands of County Carlow
 Ballygowan, County Galway; see List of townlands of County Galway
 Ballygowan, County Louth; see List of townlands of County Louth
 Ballygowan, County Mayo; see List of townlands of County Mayo
 In Kilkenny; see List of townlands of County Kilkenny
 Ballygowan (Ponsonby)
 Ballygowan (Reade)

Places in Scotland
 Ballygowan, Kilmartin Glen, site of prehistoric cup-and-ring marks
 Cnoc Ballygowan, Isle of Arran

Other
 Ballygowan water, mineral water brand
 Ballygowan, a horse which started the 1965 Grand National

Similar spelling
 Balgowan (disambiguation)
 Ballygown, Isle of Mull, Argyll and Bute, Scotland